Godfrey Lonsdale 'Gordon' Stettler (1900–1951) was an Australian rugby league footballer who played in the 1910s and 1920s.

Playing career
Stettler played for the Western Suburbs club. Named Godfrey after his father, but known as 'Gordon' or 'Lon', Stettler played eight seasons for Wests between 1919 and 1926 and also captained the club during his career. 

He was also a representative player for New South Wales, featuring in four matches for the Blues in 1925.

Death
Stettler died on 4 June 1951, aged 51.

References

1900 births
1951 deaths
Western Suburbs Magpies players
New South Wales rugby league team players
Australian rugby league players
Rugby league wingers
Rugby league centres
Rugby league players from Sydney